The South Dakota Mines Hardrockers football program represents the South Dakota School of Mines and Technology (SDSM&T) in college football. In 2010, South Dakota Mines announced that it would end the school's affiliation with the National Association of Intercollegiate Athletics (NAIA) to join the National Collegiate Athletic Association's Division II beginning with the 2011 season as a probationary member and becoming a full member in 2013.

The Hardrockers also went by the "Longhairs" early in their history. They have played football since 1895 with hiatuses taken in 1896–1899, 1907, 1915, and 1942–1945.

West River Rivalry-Black Hills Brawl

SDSM&T's first ever game was an 18–0 loss to Black Hills College (now Black Hills State University) on Nov. 28, 1895. This would prove to be a long-standing rivalry.

SDSM&T's main athletic rival is Black Hills State University. The rivalry is generated from proximity, with BHSU located less than 50 miles to the west in Spearfish, South Dakota. Educational differences between the schools also help fuel the rivalry, with BHSU being mainly a liberal arts college and SDSM&T an engineering/STEM-only research university. The football rivalry is the fourth most-frequently played series in the US, behind the Harvard–Yale football rivalry (131), Princeton–Yale (138), and The Rivalry (Lafayette–Lehigh) (151 games). It is also the oldest football series west of the Mississippi River and the most played between current NCAA Div. II teams. Generally, the last game of each season is reserved for the two schools to play, however the two schools may play twice in the same season (early in their history have played three times in a season) or earlier in the year. The teams battle for the Homestake Trophy, named for a mine in the Black Hills area and adorned with a prospector's pan. The rivalry is called the Black Hills Brawl, due to the location of the schools and ferocity in which the teams play each other, or the West River Rivalry, named for the area of South Dakota that both school's inhabit.

Since their first meeting in football 1895, the schools have played total of 131 times and to the point of having at least one yearly game since 1919 (excluding the lack of teams from 1942 to 1945 due to World War II). The only years they have not played one game against each other but have had teams are 1902, 1904, 1910, 1911, and 1918. The Hardrockers currently lead the series 65–60–11

Head coaching history
There have been 37 recorded coaches in the school's history.

References

External links
 

 
American football teams established in 1895
1895 establishments in South Dakota